Obolon is a station on Kyiv Metro's Obolonsko–Teremkivska Line. The station was opened on 19 December 1980 in the southern part of the Obolon Raion (district) of Kyiv. It was designed by T.A. Tselikovska, A.S. Krushynskyi, and A. Pratsiuk. The station was formerly known as Prospekt Korniichuka until 1990.

The station is located shallow underground and consists of a central hall with columns. The walls along the tracks have been covered with yellow marble and decorated with two bronze works of art. Lights surround the columns, giving the station its light. The station is accessible by passenger tunnels; one leading to the Obolon Prospect, and the other — to Marshala Malynovskoho Street.

External links
 Kyivsky Metropoliten — Station description and photographs 
 Metropoliten.kiev.ua — Station description and photographs 

Kyiv Metro stations
Railway stations opened in 1980
Obolonskyi District
1980 establishments in Ukraine